Vachaspati  ( "lord of Vāc (speech)") is a Rigvedic deity presiding over human life. The name is applied especially to Brhaspati, the lord of eloquence, but also to Soma, Vishvakarman and Prajapati.

Rigvedic deities
Sanskrit poets